Dharmapuri is a special grade town in the north western part of Tamil Nadu, India. It serves as the administrative headquarters of Dharmapuri district which is the first district created in Tamil Nadu after the independence of India by splitting it from then Salem district on 2 October 1965. The city is located at 50 km from Krishnagiri, 69 km from Salem, 90 km from Hosur, 117 km from Thiruvannamalai, 126 km from Bangalore and Erode, 181 km from Tiruppur, 200 km from Coimbatore and Tiruchirappalli, 300 km from Madurai and the state capital Chennai. It is located between latitudes N 11 47’ and 12 33’ and longitudes E 77 02’ and 78 40’. It is one of the leading major cultivator and producer of mango in the state along with Krishnagiri often referred as Mango Capital of India.

History
Dharmapuri was called Thagadoor where King Adhiyamaan ruled. Adhiyaman Kottai is situated near Dharmapuri-Salem highway. Many temples were built during Adhiyamaan's rule. There is a tunnel from Adhiyamaan kottai temple to Dharmapuri Kottai temple.

The region is believed to have been controlled by the Pallava dynasty in the 8th century. The Rashtrakutas took over in the 9th century. They were defeated by the Cholas in the 11th century, and subsequently the district came under the Chola sphere of governance.[2]

During 18th century present day Dharmapuri district was part of the Kingdom of Mysore and was called Baramahal. As part of the Treaty of Seringapatam (signed on 18 March 1792) after the Third Anglo-Mysore War, Tipu Sultan agreed to give part of his territories including present-day Dharmapuri district to the British East India Company which was then merged into the Madras Presidency an administrative subdivision of British India.

It was part of the salem District under British rule, until the founding of Dharmapuri district on 2 October 1965. The Dharmapuri district was split into Dharmapuri and Krishnagiri districts in 2004.[2] Many historical rock sculptures are found in this district. Modhur, a village near Dharmapuri has remains that date back to the Neolithic age. A government museum in Dharmapuri city displays some of these significant sculptures. It was also mentioned in anime Steins;gate in episode - 5

Geography

Dharmapuri is situated in the northwestern corner of Tamil Nadu and is bounded by Eastern Ghats on the east, Nallampalli taluk on the South, Palacode taluk on the north, and the Pennagaram taluk on the west. It is located between latitudes N 11 47’ and 12 33’ and longitudes E 77 02’ and 78 40’. It is 300 km from Chennai city and 130 km from Bangalore. All the corporations in Tamil Nadu except Sivakasi, Nagercoil, Thoothukudi and Tirunelveli lies within 300 km from Dharmapuri.  Neighboring states cities like Bangalore, Mysore, Tumkur, Chittoor, Tirupathi, Thrissur, Palakkad, Salem, Puducherry also lie within a 300 km radius. Dharmapuri is located on one of the geographically important areas in south India.

Climate
 
Dharmapuri has a tropical wet and dry climate (Köppen Aw). The tropical forests here generally have short shrubs and thorned plants.

Demographics

According to 2011 census, Dharmapuri had a population of 113218 with a sex-ratio of 1,013 females for every 1,000 males, much above the national average of 929. A total of 6,759 were under the age of six, constituting 3,470 males and 3,289 females. Scheduled Castes and Scheduled Tribes accounted for 6.92% and 0.14% of the population respectively. The average literacy of the town was 77.08%, compared to the national average of 72.99%. The town had a total of 17136 households. There were a total of 26,943 workers, comprising 606 cultivators, 427 main agricultural laborers, 1,052 in household industries, 22,566 other workers, 2,292 marginal workers, 54 marginal cultivators, 77 marginal agricultural laborers, 213 marginal workers in household industries and 1,948 other marginal workers.

As per the religious census of 2011, Dharmapuri (M) had 88.99% Hindus, 9.65% Muslims, 0.99% Christians, 0.02% Sikhs, 0.01% Buddhists, 0.01% Jains and 0.33% following other religions.

Politics
It is part of the Dharmapuri (state assembly constituency) and Dharmapuri (Lok Sabha constituency). The Member of Lok Sabha is S. Senthilkumar (Dharmapuri).

Transport

Roadways
Dharmapuri is well connected by major National highway NH-44. Commonly called north–south corridor which originates from Srinagar and terminates at Kanyakumari passes through the district. Another highway it encompasses is NH-844 which originates from dharmapuri adhiyamankottai and terminates at Neraluru village near chandapura, Bengaluru.
State highways like SH-60 (Hogenakkal-Pennagaram-Dharmapuri-Tirupattur), & SH-60A(Dharmapuri-Harur) via Morappur.Also passes through the city.

Railways
Dharmapuri railway station (DPJ) is situated 1.6 kilometer from Dharmapuri bus stand. The station was fractured to South Western Railways when they reformed it. Now it is under the Bangalore railway division. The railway station currently has one functional line, the Bengaluru–Dharmapuri–Salem line. The other line, Dharmapuri–Morappur line, which was constructed in 1907 functioned for about 38 years and was removed by the Indian government. However again the line is under construction with electrification due to the necessity of the people in the district. This new line will connect the people of Dharmapuri district to Chennai directly. As well as this line is the alternative route for Bangalore–Chennai (via Dharmapuri). Dharmapuri has two more important railway stations viz. Morappur (MAP) and Bommidi (BQI) which comes under Southern Railway Salem Division. These stations connects Chennai and Coimbatore through Katpadi, Jolarpet, Salem, Erode Junctions,

Airways

References

See also

 Dharmapuri (Lok Sabha constituency)
 Dharmapuri railway station

Cities and towns in Dharmapuri district